The Buried Life is a reality documentary series on MTV. The series features Duncan Penn, Jonnie Penn, Ben Nemtin, and Dave Lingwood attempting to complete a list of "100 things to do before you die." The pilot episode aired on January 18, 2010, and the show was renewed for a second season in 2010. On October 25, 2011, The Buried Life announced they wouldn't be doing any more episodes of the show. Shortly after their show's cancellation, the creators said they were working on a "new and improved" show for the network based on the premise of the original series. No new details on a new series have since been released.

Penn, Lingwood, Penn and Nemtin released their first book as The Buried Life, "What Do You Want to Do Before You Die?" on March 27, 2012. On the week of April 15, 2012, the book climbed to #1 on The New York Times Best Seller List.

Premise
The series focuses on four friends (Ben, Duncan, Jonnie and Dave) as they travel across North America in a purple transit bus named "Penelope" to complete a list of "100 things to do before you die." For every item they try to complete on their list, they help a stranger achieve one of their dreams and encourage others to go after their own lists. The series centered around the question: "What do you want to do before you die?" They have crossed off most of the numbers on their list. Episodes included completing tasks ranging from asking a girl out to surviving on a desert island.

Background
The Buried Life is a company formed by four university students from Canada. The four grew up in Victoria, British Columbia located on Vancouver Island. The idea for the name originated from an 1852 Matthew Arnold poem entitled "The Buried Life".

The project filmed its first full feature documentary in the summer months of 2006 (August) and 2007 (August to October).  The documentary is titled The Buried Life: What Do You Want To Do Before You Die? It tells the story of four friends who make a list of 100 things to do before they die and their journey across North America to accomplish it. The film was shot in locales throughout Canada and the United States including: British Columbia, California, Idaho, Nevada, Oregon, Texas and Washington, D.C.

In 2007 The Buried Life was offered a television show in Canada but ultimately turned it down citing they were not willing to give up creative control of the project.

On April 18, 2009, an article in The New York Times announced that a serial television version of their documentary titled The Buried Life was chosen by MTV for development. The show was selected as a flagship reality program that would usher in MTV's shift away from the superficial content currently dominating the network's programming, toward the production of more socially conscious media, something the Times dubbed "MTV for the era of Obama."

In an interview with Shave Magazine, Dave Lingwood revealed that MTV first found the boys on YouTube and later reached an agreement with them whereby they would film, edit and cut all the material themselves and send MTV "the finished product and they just air it."

Reception

Awards and nominations
In 2012 The Buried Life's book titled "What Do You Want To Do Before You Die?" became a NYT #1 Best Seller, it remained on the list for 4 weeks.

In May 2012 after making a bet with their fans sent a copy of their book titled "What Do You Want To Do Before You Die?" into space.

In April 2012 The Buried Life organized and set the Guinness Book World Record for the biggest speed dating event in history.

In 2010, The Buried Life earned a nomination for the Do Something TV Show Award from the VH1 Do Something Awards. The Buried Life received a nomination for its efforts to encourage people to pursue their life goals.

After originally failing in their attempts to play basketball against the President, in the spring of 2010 The Buried Life finally crossed off Playing Basketball with Obama during a visit to the White House.

In 2010 The Buried Life appeared on The Oprah Winfrey Show where they helped a young girl conquer her fear of heights.

In 2011, The Buried Life again earned a nomination for the Do Something TV Show Award from the VH1 Do Something Awards.

In October 2010 The Buried Life helped make a $100,000 donation to the World Food Programme (Fighting Hunger World Wide).

In October 2010 The Buried Life set the record for the largest roulette spin in Vegas history making a bet of $250,000 on black at The Golden Gate Casino. The previous record was set at $135,000 by radio personality Howard Stern.

In February 2011 The Buried Life were Nominated for the 15th annual Prism Awards. The PRISM Awards honor productions that are not only powerfully entertaining, but realistically show substance abuse and addiction, as well as mental health issues.

In July 2011, The Buried Life helped to make a $300,000 donation to The Keep America Beautiful foundation.

Cast
David Lingwood is a competitive break-dancer with a lust for life and adventure. He also briefly pursued a degree in sociology at Concordia University in Montreal. He was briefly married in Las Vegas, NV, crossing #91 off his bucket list: Get Married in Vegas. The marriage was later annulled.
Ben Nemtin grew up playing sports and continued with athleticism throughout high school. After graduating, he was selected as a member of the Canadian National Rugby Team, and also earned academic and athletic scholarships to attend the University of Victoria, where he attended as a science major who then made a switch to major in business.
Duncan Penn attended University of Victoria and later the John Molson School of Business, where he graduated with honors. After college he helped found a charity, OA Projects, which builds soccer programs for youth affected by war, and has made a positive impact on communities in Ecuador, Rwanda and Uganda.
Jonnie Penn is enrolled at McGill University in Montreal, with a double major in History and English Literature. He is currently attending Cambridge University.  Jonnie was a winner at the Sacramento Film Festival by the age of eighteen. In addition, he was also selected to represent the country of Canada at the Oxford University Debate Championships.

Episodes

Season 1

Season 2

The book
What Do You Want to Do Before You Die? by The Buried Life, Jonnie Penn, Dave Lingwood, Duncan Penn and Ben Nemtin was published and released by Artisan Books on March 27, 2012. The illustrated paperback chronicles The Buried Life's ongoing journey to complete their list of 100 things and to inspire others to make their own list. "Our goal was to give people the feeling that you can do anything," said Jonnie Penn. "We started with that. We scribbled down the ones that moved us ... Some are sad, some are hilarious, some are scandalous. We wanted to get that balance.".  The premise of the book surrounds list items sent to them by viewers.  A select few were chosen and incorporated into the book as depicted by an artist.  The book also contains personal accounts from Ben, Jonnie, Duncan and Dave, each explaining personal stories leading to the creation of the group.  The book became a #1 New York Times Bestseller shortly after its release, crossing off number 19 on their list.

The original list
1.) 
2.) 
3.) 
4.) 
5.) 
6.) 
7.) 
8.) 
9.) 
10.) 
11.) 
12.) 
13.) 
14.) 
15.) Get on the cover of Rolling Stone
16.) 
17.) 
18.) 
19.) 
20.) 
21.) 
22.) 
23.) 
24.) 
25.) 
26.) Tell a judge: "You want the truth? You can't handle the truth!"
27.) 
28.) 
29.) 
30.) 
31.) 
32.) 
33.) 
34.) 
35.) 
36.) 
37.) 
38.) 
39.) 
40.) 
41.) 
42.) 
43.) 
44.) 
45.) 
46.) 
47.) 
48.) 
49.) 
50.)  and get away with it
51.) 
52.) 
53.) 
54.) 
55.) Kiss Rachel McAdams
56.) 
57.) 
58.) 
59.) 
60.) 
61.) 
62.) 
63.) 
64.) 
65.) 
66.) 
67.) 
68.) 
69.) 
70.) 
71.) 
72.) 
73.) 
74.) 
75.) 
76.) 
77.) 
78.) 
79.) Dance with Ellen DeGeneres
80.) 
81.) 
82.) 
83.) 
84.) 
85.) 
86.) 
87.) Pay off our parents' mortgage
88.) 
89.) Experience zero gravity
90.) 
91.) Get married 
92.) 
93.) 
94.) 
95.) 
96.) 
97.) 
98.) 
99.) Host Saturday Night Live
100.) Go to space

References

External links
 

2010s American reality television series
2010 American television series debuts
2010 American television series endings
English-language television shows
MTV reality television series